This is a list of the songs that reached number one in Mexico in 1963, according to Billboard magazine with data provided by Audiomusica.

Chart History

By country of origin
Number-one artists:

Number-one compositions (it denotes the country of origin of the song's composer[s]; in case the song is a cover of another one, the name of the original composition is provided in parentheses):

See also
1963 in music

References

Sources
Print editions of the Billboard magazine from January 26 to December 28, 1963.

1963 in Mexico
Mexico
1963